Giuseppe Ogna (5 November 1933 – 8 May 2010) was an Italian cyclist who won a bronze medal at the 1956 Summer Olympics.

In his career won also a gold medal at the Track Cycling World Championships.

Biography
He won his Olympic medal in tandem with Cesare Pinarello.
 In 1959, he appeared on the television show What's My Line?. He died in 2010 aged 76.

References

External links
 

1933 births
2010 deaths
Italian male cyclists
Cyclists at the 1956 Summer Olympics
Olympic cyclists of Italy
Olympic bronze medalists for Italy
Cyclists from Brescia
Olympic medalists in cycling
Medalists at the 1956 Summer Olympics